Enough is a 2002 American thriller film directed by Michael Apted. The movie is based on the 1998 novel Black and Blue, by Anna Quindlen, which was a New York Times bestseller. It stars Jennifer Lopez as Slim, an abused wife who learns to fight back. Enough garnered generally negative reviews from film critics on its release, though it is now often cited as an underrated thriller.

Plot
Slim is a waitress in a Los Angeles diner where she meets Mitch Hiller, who wards off a rude man trying to hit on her for a bet. They eventually marry, have a daughter named Gracie, and live happily in an expensive house.

Years later, Slim finds out Mitch has been cheating on her. When she threatens to leave, he begins to beat and threaten her. He insists that because he is the breadwinner, he gets to do whatever he likes, and he won't end his affair unless she wants to fight him.

Slim goes to Mitch's mother about the abuse, but she is unsympathetic and implies the abuse is Slim's fault. Her best friend Ginny tells her to leave him and press charges, but when she goes to the police, even they are unable to offer any help.

Mitch tells Slim he knows she discussed the abuse with his mother, beating her again, and she realizes she has no other choice but to take Gracie and leave. Slim enlists her friends to help her and Gracie escape late at night, but Mitch foils the plan. After some struggle, they all escape.

Mitch freezes and empties Slim's bank accounts, leaving her unable to rent a room. Tracking her down at a cheap motel, he tries to break into the room, but she escapes with Gracie, moving to Seattle to stay with her ex boyfriend, but old friend, Joe.

The next day, men posing as the FBI show up and threaten Joe, damaging his apartment. Slim then goes to her wealthy, estranged father, Jupiter. Even though Slim sent several unanswered letters to him as a child, Jupiter claims he is unaware of her existence and believes she is just after money. Slim and Gracie briefly find refuge at a commune, where Jupiter later contacts her, revealing that Mitch's associates had threatened him, which caused him to be interested to help her. He sends her a large sum of money, which allows her to set up a new life under a new identity, and he lets her know to reach out if she needs more.

Joe visits Slim, but Mitch tracks her down and she escapes with Gracie. Consulting a lawyer, she is warned there is little she can do, although he tells her the custody hearing is possibly a trick to lure her back to Mitch. Slim then goes into hiding in San Francisco and sends Gracie away to safety while she trains in Krav Maga self-defense while enlisting the help of a woman who looks identical to her. She breaks into Mitch's new home and hides his guns, jams the phone, plants fake letters saying she is there to discuss custody of Gracie and awaits his return. When he arrives they fight and Slim beats Mitch unconscious before she eventually knocks him off a balcony to his death. The police regard her actions as self-defense. Slim and Gracie reunite and go to live with Joe in Seattle.

Cast

Production

Casting and filming
Enough, produced by Columbia Pictures, is directed by Michael Apted and written by Nicholas Kazan. On November 9, 2000, New York Daily News reported that Lopez was in talks to star in Enough, "which follows a newly married young woman's descent into domestic violence after her dream man physically abuses her, causing her to go on the run". Sandra Bullock was originally cast to play Slim, a waitress. In November 2000 Variety magazine reported that Bullock had to back out of Enough because of scheduling conflict with another film.

On May 19, 2001, it was reported that Lopez was cast as Slim, and Once and Again actor Billy Campbell was cast as Mitch, a "wealthy contractor" and Slim's abusive husband. Juliette Lewis, Noah Wyle, Dan Futterman and Fred Ward were also announced to be co-starring in the film. According to Basham, filming began on May 21, 2001, and took place on location in Los Angeles, San Francisco, Port Townsend and Seattle. During a documentary featured on a special edition DVD of the film, Kazan said Lopez was "very good" at creating the character on the film "through unscripted details, physical gestures and fiddling with props." He described her emotional acting as "perfect pitch". Apted, who had heard rumors that Lopez was a diva, described her as "fantastic" and good to work with. He also noted Lopez was "very much on the case, and that was very impressive." 

In 2008, Lopez revealed that during the filming of Enough, she overworked and had a nervous breakdown: "I was suffering from a lack of sleep. And I did have a kind of nervous breakdown. I froze up on set. Well, not on a set, but in my trailer. I was like, I don't want to move, I don't want to talk, I don't want to do anything. It was on that movie, Enough. Yeah, I did. I had a nervous breakdown."

Themes

Enough is a thriller film that details an abusive relationship. Its writer Nicholas Kazan commented, "About the worst aspect of the male psyche is that males have been taught, traditionally, to expect to get what they want. Much of the problems that men have, or the problems that men impose on women, have to do with feeling like they're entitled, and that women should do what men want." Ryan J. Downey of MTV News said, "Is America ready to see its favorite iced-up, well-manicured diva, Jennifer Lopez, all glammed-down and kicking ass as a battered wife?".

Explaining the concept of the film, Lopez stated: "There's twists and turns and it's exciting ... but it also has a message, which is what attracted me to it in the first place, which is an empowering thing." Describing its message, she said "[If] you're in these negative situations, negative relationships, whatever, you can get out ... The power to get out of those things is always within yourself. That's the message of the movie." When Lopez read the script, she knew she was "going to have to do [the] whole sequence at the end" which featured an act that required her to "become a believable lean, mean fighting machine." 

Lopez then thought she should learn T'ai Chi or Tae Kwon Do, but was worried about learning it at an expert level in a short time. Her trainer then suggested that she study Krav Maga, the "official self-defense system of the Israeli Defense Forces which has recently become trendy in the States. The fighting style focuses on combating realistic scenarios with moves that are based on common, instinctual reactions", according to MTV News. Talking about the system, Lopez said: "[Krav Maga] levels out the playing field between men and women ... Where it doesn't matter how big or tall or strong you are. You can actually maneuver around that. It's about getting out of the way, counter-attacking and using whatever you can to get the upper hand."

During an interview with Lopez, discussing the resolution of the film, journalist Diane Sawyer of ABC News noted that people "in the abuse counseling industry have said: you can't tell women that; they can't do that. That's something that's dangerous, even to see it in their minds." Lopez responded: "...this is a movie that touches upon those themes, but really, it's a thriller ... it's about empowering yourself in any situation ... that you have. When I read the script, I saw it as: you have the power within yourself, no matter how severe the situation can be, to change whatever that is, to find that power within yourself to change any negative situation."

Release
Enough was planned to be released in September 2001, but was pushed back to "early" 2002. It was released on May 24, 2002. With a production budget of $38 million, its first run grossed $40 million domestically and a total of $51.8 million worldwide. After its opening week, Enough ranked at No. 5 on the American Box Office chart, grossing over $14 million screened across 2,623 theaters. The next week, it grossed $6.8 million, dropping to No. 7 at the box office, and grossed $3.7 million after its third week, falling to No. 9.

Home media
Sony Pictures Home Entertainment released the DVD of Enough on October 8, 2002, in Dolby Digital English and French languages, as well as subtitles. A VHS edition was released on March 4, 2003. A special widescreen edition containing an aspect ratio of 2.40:1 was released on September 16, 2003; it also included Spanish language options. It has a range of extras which includes three deleted scenes: "Strip Joint Break In", "Enough Is Enough" and "Krav Maga: Contact Combat". Lopez's music video for the song's soundtrack "Alive" is also included. 

During a "making-of" documentary for the film entitled "Max on the Set: Enough" Lopez stated she was attracted to Enough because it was "like a female Rocky". Cynthia Fuchs from PopMatters wrote an in-depth review of the special edition DVD release, and said: "Just why this film needs a second DVD release is unclear, except for the apparent diktat that there is no such thing as enough or even too much J-Lo".

Reception
On Rotten Tomatoes, the film holds an approval rating of 22% based on 125 reviews, with an average rating of 4.1/10. The site's critics consensus reads: "Enough exploits the serious issue of spousal abuse to make an illogical, unintelligent thriller." On Metacritic, the film has a weighted average score of 25 out of 100, based on 32 critics, indicating "generally unfavorable reviews". Audiences surveyed by CinemaScore gave the film an average grade of "A−" on an A+ to F scale.

Stephen Holden of The New York Times said Lopez "holds the screen in a star performance that has less to do with acting than with embodying a forceful, streetwise woman who stands up for herself", while commenting that its preview had "audience gasping" and "Enough does a better job than most movies of sustaining a mood of palpable physical menace, then confirming your worst fears". Alice King of Entertainment Weekly described the film's plot as "arduously nonsensical" and felt that Lopez lacked connection with her on-screen daughter Tessa Allen, commenting that: "All this to protect a helium-voiced little girl with whom Lopez has so little chemistry, it's as if she's handling garbage rather than a small child." 

Blake French from Contactmusic.com was underwhelmed with the development of the film, and was critical that the film does not use Slim's old friend and romantic interest enough, nor does it develop Slim's real and adopted father figures while it "uses the tiresome old 'kid' cliché. Gracie is, as always, just old enough to understand the situation, but not quite old enough to make an actual impact in the story." French did praise Lopez in the end sequence, "By the final scenes, despite their obviousness, I was as engrossed in the movie as I could have been, actually rooting for J. Lo to kick some bad guy butt". 

Mick LaSalle of the San Francisco Chronicle wrote: "Lopez has an image of being sexy and tough, but her appeal as an actress is that she's down to earth and that her emotions are accessible. There's nothing cold about her." Additionally, LaSalle felt that "It's the most tension-producing movie out there right now", stating that "it has the biggest visceral kick, capable of inspiring blood lust in otherwise peaceful viewers.

ReelViews' James Berardinelli said Enough is director "[Michael] Apted at his most commercial, and, unfortunately, his least compelling." Michael Atkinson of The Village Voice called Campbell the film's "primary power source", "His steely gaze and overbearing quietude are forever tainted; Enough doesn't stand a chance in Lifetime reruns". 

Robert Koehler of Variety was negative: "Enough, a thriller detailing how a good wife gets back at an evil, possessive husband, is never provocative enough to generate strong emotional response." Roger Ebert of the Chicago Sun-Times called the film "tacky material" and was surprised to "see a director like Michael Apted and an actress like Jennifer Lopez" involved in it. 

Paula Nechack of the Seattle Post-Intelligencer called Enough "implausible and ugly" and felt that it had already been done by actresses including Julia Roberts and Ashley Judd, and its script was "more than enough of a mess to tarnish her box-office luster." 

Maitland McDonagh of TV Guide reviewed the film negatively, but praised the ending sequence, "If ever a movie was undermined by its packaging, it's this formulaic thriller about a resourceful battered wife and the brutal husband who won't let her go ... the entire promotional campaign is driven by the last 20 minutes, in which Slim becomes a lean, mean fighting machine and kicks the bastard's ass". 

Nathan Rabin of The A.V. Club said "the film's idiocy works for Lopez: Every diva needs at least one camp classic on her résumé". Desson Thomson from The Washington Post emphasized his disappointment with the film, stating: "In terms of actual social conscience, the movie gets a demagogic, rabble-rousing F. It also gets a failed grade for honest writing."

Accolades
Jennifer Lopez was nominated for a Golden Raspberry Award for Worst Actress for her performance in the film (as well as for Maid in Manhattan) but lost in a tie to both Madonna for Swept Away and Britney Spears for Crossroads.

Soundtrack

The official score for Enough was composed by David Arnold, and released by Audio CD on June 4, 2002. In addition to its score, Lopez recorded the song entitled "Alive", which she co-wrote with her then-husband Cris Judd. Although it served as the song's soundtrack and was used during the film, it does not appear on the film's score.

References

External links
 
 

2002 films
2000s action drama films
2002 thriller drama films
American action drama films
American thriller drama films
Columbia Pictures films
Films scored by David Arnold
Films about domestic violence
Films based on American novels
Films directed by Michael Apted
Films produced by Irwin Winkler
Films set in San Francisco
Films shot in Washington (state)
2002 drama films
Films about stalking
Films about mother–daughter relationships
Films about divorce
2000s English-language films
2000s American films